Mechernich is a town in the district of Euskirchen in the south of the state of North Rhine-Westphalia, Germany. It is located in the "Naturpark Nordeifel" in the Eifel hills, approx. 15 km south-west of Euskirchen and 55 km from Cologne. Mechernich is a former mining town and had, in 2009, its 700-years celebration of foundation. Its local football club is called TUS Mechernich.

Districts

Mechernich has the following districts:

Antweiler, Berg, Bergbuir, Bergheim, Bescheid, Bleibuir, Breitenbenden, Denrath, Dreimühlen, Eicks, Eiserfey, Floisdorf, Glehn, Harzheim, Heufahrtshütte, Holzheim, Hostel, Kallmuth, Katzvey, Kommern, Kommern-Süd, Lessenich, Lorbach, Lückerath, Mechernich, Obergartzem, Rissdorf, Roggendorf, Satzvey (Satzvey Castle), Schaven, Schützendorf, Strempt, Urfey, Voißel, Vollem, Vussem, Wachendorf, Weiler am Berge, Weißenbrunnen, Weyer and Wielspütz.

Mining tour
A tour takes place in the Eifel region, in the galleries of the mining museum in Mechernich.

Museums 
 Kommern Open Air Museum in Kommern
 Mining museum and visitor mine  of Grube Günnersdorf
 Nuclear bunker of the North Rhine-Westphalia State Central Bank

Twin town

Since 30 July 1967, the twin town of Mechernich is Nyons, France.

References

Towns in North Rhine-Westphalia
Euskirchen (district)
Districts of the Rhine Province